Hypsilurus papuensis, the Papua forest dragon, is a species of agama. It is endemic to Papua New Guinea and found in both New Guinean mainland and on the D'Entrecasteaux and Trobriand Islands.

Two subspecies are recognized:

Hypsilurus papuensis is a highly arboreal lizard inhabiting both lowland and montane primary rainforest.

References

Hypsilurus
Reptiles of Papua New Guinea
Endemic fauna of Papua New Guinea
Taxa named by William John Macleay
Reptiles described in 1877
Agamid lizards of New Guinea